Flabellina bulbosa is a species of sea slug, an aeolid nudibranch, a marine  gastropod mollusc in the family Flabellinidae.

Distribution
This species was described from the island of Sal, Cape Verde.

References

Flabellinidae
Gastropods described in 1998
Fauna of Sal, Cape Verde
Gastropods of Cape Verde